Jack Sharkey (born Joseph Paul Zukauskas, October 26, 1902 – August 17, 1994)  was a Lithuanian-American world heavyweight boxing champion.

Boxing career
He took his ring name from his two idols, heavyweight contender Tom Sharkey and heavyweight champion Jack Dempsey, to gain acceptance in the Irish-dominated boxing world of Boston. He won an important fight in 1926 over black heavyweight contender Harry Wills, but his first big year was 1927, when he defeated former light heavyweight champ Mike McTigue in twelve rounds and Boston rival Jim Maloney in five. That put him in the ring on July 21, 1927, with his idol Dempsey, the winner to meet heavyweight champion Gene Tunney for the title. For six rounds Sharkey engaged in fierce infighting with Dempsey who had a slight lead on the scorecards. In the seventh round, Sharkey turned his head to complain to the referee about an alleged low punch and Dempsey landed a classic left hook that knocked Sharkey out.

In 1928 Sharkey defeated heavyweight contender Tom Heeney and former light-heavyweight champion Jack Delaney. Early in 1929, he signed in a Tex Rickard promotion to fight Young Stribling in Miami, Sharkey and all involved suffered a scare when Rickard died unexpectedly. All preparations ceased as Rickard was laid to rest in New York. Unhappy with the uncertainty of it all, Jack complained to sportswriter Dan Parker, "That man isn't in his grave yet, and already they're trying to break my contract."  In fact Bill Carey, president of Madison Square Garden saved the day by appointing Jack Dempsey himself to the task. Dempsey, a close personal friend of Rickard, had never handled a promotion before, but did so now with what might be called "large and largesse". Between leasing the Carl Fisher mansion on Miami Beach as well as the George Washington Hotel, the latter of which was equipped for the press with a 24-hour bar, the Sharkey-Stribling fight at the old Flamingo Park drew 40,000 fans, including 423 writers, and did $405,000 at the box office, an amount unsurpassed in the South until television receipts for Clay vs. Liston in 1964 managed a richer gate.

A fight held in Yankee Stadium later that year gave Sharkey the United States heavyweight title when he knocked out former light heavyweight champion Tommy Loughran. This victory earned him the opportunity to fight for the vacant world title against the German contender Max Schmeling on June 12, 1930. Sharkey was disqualified in the fourth round after delivering a punch that landed below Schmeling's belt. This was the first time in boxing history that the heavyweight championship was won on a foul since Joe Goss in 1876.

In October 1931, Sharkey defeated Italian heavyweight, Primo Carnera and was then given another chance to fight for the title. On June 21, 1932, at the Madison Square Garden Bowl in Long Island City, New York, Sharkey defeated Schmeling in a controversial split decision to win the championship. Sharkey lost the title on June 29, 1933, in his second fight with Primo Carnera. This meant that Sharkey was the first heavyweight champion in history to both win and lose the championship against a European fighter. Floyd Patterson repeated this feat when regaining the title against Ingemar Johansson, having lost it to the Swede in their first fight. Oliver McCall then became the third such heavyweight champion when he beat Lennox Lewis for the WBC title in 1994 before losing it to Lewis's countryman Frank Bruno the following year. In recent years, with the proliferation of European-born world heavyweight champions, fighters such as Chris Byrd and Hasim Rahman have also won and lost their championships against European opposition. Sharkey's distinction is noteworthy, however, as Schmeling and Carnera were, respectively, only the third and fourth Europeans to win the world heavyweight championship.

Later in life, Sharkey would allege that his second fights with both Schmeling and Carnera were fixed. He took a year off, fought four mediocre fights, and then fought Joe Louis on August 18, 1936, losing by knockout in the third round. This made him the only man to fight both Dempsey and Louis.

Sharkey then retired with a record of 38-14-3 with 13 knockouts. As the Cyber Boxing Zone website describes him, "Sharkey had good skills, could hit with power, box well and take punishment when he set his mind to fight; But, he was an erratic, 'up-and-down' boxer who never seemed to put all his skills together consistently; when he was good, he was very good but when he was bad, he was awful."

Notable bouts refereed
Ex-world heavyweight champion Jack Sharkey refereed the world light heavyweight title defense by Archie Moore against Yvon Durelle on December 10, 1958, at The Forum, in Montreal, Quebec, Canada, one of boxing's first championship televised bouts. Moore came off the canvas three times in the first round, and again in the fifth round, to knock out Durelle in the eleventh round. Sharkey also refereed the rematch at The Forum, in which Moore knocked down Durelle four times in the third round before knocking him out on August 12, 1959. Both bouts were world televised in black and white from Canada, with commentary and post-fight interviews.

Professional boxing record
All information in this section is derived from BoxRec, unless otherwise stated.

Official Record

All newspaper decisions are officially regarded as “no decision” bouts and are not counted in the win/loss/draw column.

Unofficial record

Record with the inclusion of newspaper decisions in the win/loss/draw column.

See also
 List of heavyweight boxing champions

References

External links
 
 
 Boxing Hall of Fame
 Fighty City Biography -- Jack Sharkey

 

1902 births
1994 deaths
American male boxers
American people of Lithuanian descent
Boxers from Boston
Boxers from New York (state)
Heavyweight boxers
International Boxing Hall of Fame inductees
World Boxing Association champions
World heavyweight boxing champions